Georges Martin (14 March 1930 – 29 July 2017) was a French engineer, a graduate of the Special School of Public Works, "mechanical-electrical" section. He designed automobile internal combustion engines, including the Poissy engine that powered various cars from Simca, Chrysler, Talbot, Plymouth, and Dodge from 1961 until 1991, as well as the successful V12 Matra Sports engine for Matra's Formula 1 team.

Biography 

Martin joined Simca in 1959, and from 1966 worked at Matra where he designed the V12 Matra Sports engine. In the Simca design office, he designed the famous Poissy engine that was in production in various displacements for 30 years, from its first appearance on the Simca 1000 in 1961 to the last production under Peugeot ownership in 1991, where it was fitted to the Peugeot 309. This engine was characterized by its reliability, power and torque for its limited displacement. It was fairly advanced for its era, having an aluminum head and sump, five main bearings, and a reasonably high compression ratio, but was sometimes criticized for having a noisy valve train. The valve noise was the result of a design decision to prioritize reliability over comfort, resulting in the fitment of a double chain that did not require a tensioner but which was noisier. The engine was successfully rallied in the 1970s and appeared in a number of cars from Simca, Matra, Chrysler, Talbot, Peugeot, Plymouth, and Dodge.

Martin joined Matra at the end of 1966, thanks to his former colleague at Simca, Philippe Guédon, who later became CEO of Matra. Arriving at Matra, he did not really know what was expected of him. It was Jean-Luc Lagardère who told him that he would work for Formula 1. The objective was to design an engine that would develop 150 hp per liter. The result of Martin's efforts was the V12 Matra Sports engine for Formula 1 which supported Matra in its victories at Le Mans from 1972 to 1974 as well as a number of Formula One Grand Prix victories.

Bibliography 
 Auto Passion, no 69 - juin 1992.
 L'Auto-Journal" du 15 mars 1990.

Notes and references

External links 
Georges Martin sur grandprix.com

French automotive engineers
People in the automobile industry
1930 births
2017 deaths
21st-century French engineers
20th-century French engineers